Flipped may refer to:

 Flipped (novel), a young adult novel by Wendelin Van Draanen
 Flipped (TV series), an American comedy series
 Flipped (2010 film), an American romantic comedy-drama film based on the novel
 Flipped (2015 film), a thriller film
 "Flipped" (Law & Order: Criminal Intent), an episode of Law & Order: Criminal Intent
 Flipped classroom, an instructional strategy
 Flipped image, an image generated by a mirror-reversal of an original across a horizontal axis

See also
Flip (disambiguation)